The Canton of Bourganeuf is a canton situated in the Creuse département and in the Nouvelle-Aquitaine region of central France.

Geography 
An area of farming and forestry in the arrondissement of Guéret, centred on the town of Bourganeuf. The altitude varies from 271m (Saint-Martin-Sainte-Catherine) to 721m (Soubrebost) with an average altitude of 452m.

Population

Composition 
At the French canton reorganisation which came into effect in March 2015, the canton was expanded from 13 to 17 communes (2 of which were merged into the new commune Saint-Dizier-Masbaraud):
 
Auriat
Bosmoreau-les-Mines
Bourganeuf
Faux-Mazuras
Mansat-la-Courrière
Montboucher
Saint-Amand-Jartoudeix
Saint-Dizier-Masbaraud
Saint-Junien-la-Bregère
Saint-Martin-Sainte-Catherine
Saint-Moreil
Saint-Pardoux-Morterolles
Saint-Pierre-Bellevue
Saint-Pierre-Chérignat
Saint-Priest-Palus
Soubrebost

See also 
 Arrondissements of the Creuse department
 Cantons of the Creuse department
 Communes of the Creuse department

References

Bourganeuf